Nicolas Thomann (born 29 November 1972) is a former professional tennis player from France.

Career
Thomann was a quarter-finalist in the 2000 Davidoff Swiss Indoors, beating top 50 players Nicolas Escude and Nicolas Lapentti en route. His best win however came in Atlanta the following year, where he had a straight sets upset win over Andre Agassi in the opening round, playing as a qualifier. The American had gone into the tournament having won his previous two tournaments, both ATP Masters Series events. 

In the 2001 French Open he competed in both the singles and men's doubles. He lost his singles match in five sets to Jan Frode Andersen and also exited in the first round of the doubles, partnering Jerome Golmard.

The Frenchman lost to Thomas Enqvist in the opening round of 2002 Australian Open but reached the second round in the 2002 Wimbledon Championships, with a win against Markus Hipfl, won 11–9 in the fifth set. He was then eliminated by Yevgeny Kafelnikov.

He reached the semi-finals at the 2003 RCA Championships, held in Indianapolis and also made the quarter-finals of the Thailand Open that year.

Challenger titles

Singles: (2)

Doubles: (1)

References

1972 births
Living people
French male tennis players
Sportspeople from Mulhouse